Rumiani (also Romanized as Rūmīānī and Rūmīyānī) is a village in Rumiani Rural District, Suri District, Rumeshkhan County, Lorestan Province, Iran. At the 2006 census, its population was 3,360, in 691 families.

References 

Populated places in Rumeshkhan County